Daniel Engler (born November 20, 1977) is an American professional wrestling referee, better known by his former ring name, Rudy Charles, best known for his time as a referee in Total Nonstop Action Wrestling (TNA), where he was the promotion's senior referee. In July 2013, Engler joined WWE at their Performance Center as a referee for NXT. He is currently signed to WWE on the Smackdown brand .

Career

Early career (1996–2002)
Engler trained as a referee under former United States Wrestling Association referee Mark Vance, whom he met at a wrestling show in the Evansville Soldiers and Sailors Memorial Coliseum, and refereed his first match on July 6, 1996.

In 1997, Engler enlisted in the Indiana Army National Guard, and underwent four months of training.

Engler joined TNA shortly after its inception in June 2002, and was quickly named senior referee. In addition to working for TNA, Engler runs a high school football website, along with his brother.

Dan Engler was the wrestling referee for the season three premiere of Pros vs Joes.

Dan Engler has run several family oriented wrestling promotions in his hometown of Evansville, IN.  He has run shows at the historic Soldiers and Sailors Memorial Coliseum (former home to the USWA), the Vanderburgh County 4-H Fairground (home to the Frog Follies classic car festival) and the CK Newsome Center, an urban community center for inner-city children.

Dan currently has a show on YouTube.com called The Rudy Charles Talk Show. His guests so far have been: former TNA/WWE referee Mike Posey, wrestlers such as Mike Rapada, Mike Rapada Jr., Steve-0, Matt Boyce, and Shawn Shultz.

Total Nonstop Action Wrestling (2002–2009; 2011)
Engler was one of the few that had been with Total Nonstop Action Wrestling (TNA) since its start in 2002. Dan was one of the first referees shown on the show, having to help hold Toby Keith back from entering the ring to fight Jeff Jarrett.

Dan's first trading card (#59) was released in 2004 by Pacific Trading Card Inc. Engler has come to have five other cards, three being in the latest TNA Trading Cards.

On January 29, 2009, Dan made his wrestling debut on TNA Wrestling, along with referee Andrew Thomas, in a handicap match against Booker T.
In a backstage interview, Engler seemed confident and talked about his amateur wrestling background. Thomas was nervous, but Engler said to follow his lead. This was all short lived as Booker T hit Rudy with an Axe Kick and finished off Andrew Thomas with the Bookend for the pin, and forced Earl Hebner to make the count.

In July 2009, Engler left TNA. However, he again appeared for TNA Impact (now branded Impact Wrestling) on the Thanksgiving Day 2011 episode and featured in several segments alongside wrestler Eric Young as well as refereeing a match between Eric Young and Robbie E. Despite not appearing since, he has referee'd in TNA's subsidiary project Ring Ka King.

Independent circuit (2009–2013)

On his debut in NWA, Shawn Shultz lost his NWA Mid-America Heavyweight Championship. On various episodes, Shultz said that Rudy screwed his match. Shultz and his manager, Tony Lucassio, called Dan a reject referee from another promotion in Orlando, noting his time in TNA. Dan Engler made his Ohio Valley Wrestling (OVW) debut as the special guest referee of a match between heel referee Chris Sharpe and OVW senior official Ray Ramsey in December 2009. He has refereed several matches in OVW since. Rudy Charles was the referee for the All Wheels Wrestling TV Pilot taping in Orlando, FL on June 29, 2011.

WWE (2013–present)

In July 2013 Engler indicated on his Twitter account that he had signed with WWE and would be working NXT tapings and would be present at the WWE Performance Center grand-opening.

Engler made his WWE pay-per-view debut at Hell In A Cell on Sunday, October 27, 2013 refereeing the Divas Championship, AJ Lee vs. Brie Bella. Engler worked under his real name Dan Engler.

He was also spotted the following monday night on Raw refereeing another Divas match, Natalya vs. Summer Rae in her debut match.

On the March 14, 2016 episode of Raw, Engler was injured after being hit in the leg with a production crate by Triple H during a backstage brawl between him and a returning Roman Reigns. He required 13 stitches and 3 sutures to close the wound.

In June 2016, he appeared as one of the seven referees for the Cruiserweight Classic.

References
 Former TNA Referee makes WWE debut at Hell in a Cell
 Rudy Charles at NXT Taping
 WWE hires Former TNA Referee Rudy Charles
 Rudy Charles issues statement regarding his release
 Big Update on TNA's Rudy Charles "Quitting" the Company
 Rudy Charles talks about his release from TNA
 TNA's Rudy Charles Speaks To TNAHeadlines.com!

External links

 

1977 births
Living people
Sportspeople from Evansville, Indiana
Professional wrestling referees